Gregorio Hilario del Pilar y Sempio (November 14, 1875 – December 2, 1899) was a Filipino general of the Philippine Revolutionary Army during the Philippine–American War.

As one of the youngest generals in the Revolutionary Army, he was known for the successful assault on the Spanish barracks in the municipality of Paombong, his victory on the first phase Battle of Quingua and his last stand at the Battle of Tirad Pass during the Philippine–American War. Because of his youth, he became known as the "Boy General". He was also known as a ladies man and was described by National Artist for Literature Nick Joaquin as the "Byron of Bulacan".

Early life and education

Born on November 14, 1875 to Fernando H. del Pilar and Felipa Sempio of Bulacan, Bulacan, the fifth among six siblings. His siblings were María de la Paz del Pilar (b.1865), Andrea del Pilar (b. 1866), Pablo H. del Pilar (b. 1869), Julian H. del Pilar (b. 1872), and Jacinto H. del Pilar (b. 1878). He was part of the del Pilar family (more properly Hilario del Pilar; Hilario was the original surname before the Claveria naming reforms and was contracted to "H.") of the principalia, whose members included his uncles, lawyer-turned-propagandist Marcelo H. del Pilar, editor-in-chief of Diariong Tagalog and La Solidaridad, as well as the priest Toribio H. del Pilar, who was exiled in Guam for his alleged involvement in the 1872 Cavite Mutiny. The del Pilar clan was distantly related to the Gatmaitans. Although principalia, Gregorio del Pilar's branch was relatively poor. It was said that del Pilar had to hawk meat pies as a child to survive.

As a child, he completed his primary education under Maestros Monico Estrella and Romualdo Sempio before being sent to study in Manila. He was enrolled at the Ateneo Municipal de Manila at the age of 15, where he was rated good in Latin, Greek, Spanish and French, middling in philosophy, and excellent in arithmetic and algebra. During his studies in the Ateneo, he stayed in the house of his paternal aunt, Hilaria H. del Pilar, and her husband, the propagandist Deodato Arellano. He helped his uncle distribute revolutionary pamphlets and other materials. There was one incident in Malolos, where del Pilar stole copies of the book Cuesteones de sumo interes from the parish priest, Father Felipe García, who had a habit of distributing counter-revolutionary materials after mass. These books were set to be distributed after the mass. Del Pilar removed the book covers and pasted the pamphlets inside before distributing them after.

Del Pilar finished his bachelor of arts in March 1896 and had intended to enroll at the School of Arts and Trades and study to become a maestro de obras; however when the revolution broke out in August of that year his plans of further study were thwarted. Del Pilar quickly went home to Bulacan and enlisted himself for military service under Colonel Vicente Enríquez.

Philippine Revolution
At the onset of the revolution, and in response to reports of "successive triumphs" in Cavite, some 3,000 revolutionary forces marched to seize the town of Paombong, Bulacan, forming a military government. Del Pilar was among those who marched towards Paombong, although there are also rumors of him being present during the Cry of Balintawak.

Del Pilar was eventually assigned to the forces of Eusébio Roque (also known as Maestrong Sébio) in Kakarong de Sili, a fort near the town of Pandi. On New Year's day, 1897, del Pilar participated in the defense of Kakarong de Sili, managing to escape with only nine others before the Spanish overran the fort. He recounts in his diary:

His courage and bravery in that action won him recognition and a promotion to the rank of lieutenant. He eventually left Roque's unit - Roque was sold out to the Spanish by his own soldiers and executed in February 1897, and del Pilar began to make his way to Imus, Cavite, reaching as far as Montalban in February. He eventually returned to Bulacan and joined Adriano Gatmaitán's army, being promoted to captain in the process.

As captain, del Pilar managed feats of bravery. He once managed to single-handedly ambush a priest and his escort of cazadores from Mambog on their way to Malolos. He shot one of the cazadores which prompted the rest to flee.

The event is termed as "pinagtambangan," according to the marker that can be found on Malolos Bridge.

This act netted him several Mauser rifles and four sacks of coins, which he distributed to his troops. He decreed that married men be given 50 pesos each, unmarried ones 25 pesos, and the remaining money be sent to Manila to buy a blanket and a cloak for each soldier.

On September 3, 1897, del Pilar executed an attack on the Spanish garrison in the town of Paombong. He and ten other men slipped into town in the night and fell upon the cazadores in the basement of the convent during Sunday mass. Del Pilar himself was stationed in the plaza, firing at the second story of the convent to prevent any men from approaching from the windows. They were eventually able to capture 14 Mauser rifles. Other versions of the raid vary, however. Some tellings talk about how del Pilar and his men slipped into town dressed as women, while other versions have them disguised as cazadores. Del Pilar's success in Paombong caught the attention of Emilio Aguinaldo, who promoted the captain to a lieutenant colonel, eventually earning his trust and being let into his inner circle of confidants. Artemio Ricarte noted that Del Pilar's feat in Paombong “exalted him to the horns of the moon."

Del Pilar celebrated his promotion to lieutenant colonel by creating a distinctive flag for himself and his battalion: a tricolor with a blue triangle at the hoist, red stripe on top and black at the bottom, taking cues from the Cuban flag. He first unfurled this flag during his participation in the Battle of Pasong Balite (modern-day Polo, Bulacan) in 1897.

Due to his closeness to Aguinaldo, del Pilar became one of the signatories of the provisional constitution of the Republic of Biak-na-Bato in November 1897. When negotiations with the Spanish took place in the which concluded with the signing of the Pact of Biak-na-Bato, Aguinaldo took del Pilar with him to exile in Hong Kong.

Second phase and the Philippine–American War
The exiles in Hong Kong organized a Supreme Council, electing del Pilar to a position second only to Tomás Mascardo. Aguinaldo's confidence in del Pilar grew such that he wrote the following about him:

When Aguinaldo was supposed to go to Europe, he took only del Pilar and Colonel José Leyba with him. The trip ended in Singapore, where Aguinaldo conferred with American consul E. Spencer Pratt, learning of the American declaration of war against Spain. Spurred by this, Aguinaldo and the other exiles decided to return to the Philippines to restart the revolution.

After the Americans defeated the Spanish in the Battle of Manila Bay, Aguinaldo, del Pilar, and other exiled leaders returned to the Philippines. Aguinaldo named del Pilar Dictator of Bulacan and Nueva Ecija provinces, an honor Aguinaldo would not confer to anybody else.

On del Pilar's return to the Philippines, he set out to liberating his home province of Bulacan, eventually accepting Spanish surrender on June 24, 1898. Del Pilar was then called to relieve the wounded General Pantaleon García and continue operations in Caloocan, ultimately succeeded on August 13, 1898. The Revolutionary Congress was then inaugurated on September 15, 1898 and del Pilar became in charge of the military parade. He was promoted to brigadier-general after this event.

When the Philippine–American War broke out in February 1899, following the cession of the Philippines by Spain to the United States in the Treaty of Paris of 1898, del Pilar fought alongside General Antonio Luna in Manila, suffering heavy casualties. Del Pilar's relationships with his fellow generals were contentious at best. General José Alejandrino wrote of del Pilar:

Another story between Luna and del Pilar have the two riding together on the front, with Luna so absorbed in what he was saying that he did not notice they were moving into a danger zone. Del Pilar did notice but did not back off because Luna had not. After Manila, del Pilar and his troops moved to Bulacan. Major General Venancio Concepción was placed under his command but the two did not get along. After the fall of Baliuag each blamed the other. Concepción was eventually moved under the command of Luna in Pampanga. Del Pilar, for his part, led his troops to a victory over Major Franklin Bell in the first phase of the Battle of Quingua (modern-day Plaridel, Bulacan) on April 23, 1899. During the battle, his forces repelled a cavalry charge and killed American Colonel John M. Stotsenburg,. The Americans were, however, reinforced during the second phase of the Battle and the Filipino forces were forced to retreat. Del Pilar then participated in the Battle of Calumpit alongside General Luna. Luna, however, had left the battle to punish General Tomás Mascardo for insubordination, leaving del Pilar with the defense of the Bagbag river. On Luna's return, the Americans had already succeeded in penetrating the Filipino lines and they were forced to retreat.

On June 4, 1899, del Pilar joined Aguinaldo in San Isidro, Nueva Ecija and received orders to capture Antonio Luna, dead or alive, on charges of high treason. It is said that had Luna not come down himself to Cabanatuan and assassinated by the Kawit Batallion from his headquarters in Bayambang that del Pilar would have gone down as Luna's killer. Del Pilar and Aguinaldo then descended upon General Concepcion's headquarters in Pampanga to relieve him of his position, as he was suspected to be partisan to the assassinated general. Troops surrounded Concepcion's headquarters and sentries were replaced by the presidential guards. Concepción was then relieved of his command on suspicions of a conspiracy being plotted against Aguinaldo.

Del Pilar was then tasked with taking possession of Luna's old headquarters in Bayambang, and of liquidating Luna's former aides-de-camp, Manuel and José Bernal. He arrived in Bayambang on June 7 and managed to capture a younger Bernal brother, Angel, who was arrested and maltreated. Manuel Bernal was captured a few days later, located in the house of the Nable José family. Remedios or Dolores, daughters of the family, was said to be one of del Pilar's last loves. Manuel was tortured in the presence of his younger brother Angel by del Pilar and his brother Julian del Pilar for a week before he was killed. José Bernal was captured soon after, taken to Angeles, Pampanga and murdered by soldiers thereafter.

After this, del Pilar was given command in Pangasinan, where he stayed for five months from June to November 1899. He was also posted in Pangasinan to defend against a possible mutiny from Ilocanos outraged with Luna's assassination, as well as to defend against the Guardia de Honor, a millenarian cult fashioned after the Katipunan. During this time, the American forces were unusually quiet but the revolutionary government failed to capitalize on this opportunity. Del Pilar himself, was engaged in a number of love affairs. In a letter sent to a relative in Bulacan, he asked for the finest of riding boots, while he ordered the best horses in Dagupan to show off his horsemanship.

By November, Tarlac had fallen to the Americans and Aguinaldo was moving northward towards Bayambang. From Bayambang, the fleeing government led an expedition to Santa Barbara. Del Pilar, at the time, had 2,000 troops: 1,000 in the del Pilar Brigade, 350 in the Joven column, 400 in the Kawit Battalion, 100 in the Corps of Lancers, and two vanguard companies. del Pilar led the expedition northward towards Ilocos. During this time he carried a briefcase containing a girl's letter and a lock of hair, from one of his loves in Bulacan.

Tirad Pass and death

In November 1899, Aguinaldo's party had reached the town of Concepción and climbed the peak of Mount Tirad. Del Pilar ordered three lines of trenches be dug up on the pass and had the "pick of all the men that can be spared" on orders from Aguinaldo. While Aguinaldo and the rest were in Cervantes, Ilocos Sur, Del Pilar rode to the rearguard to ensure the safety of the retreat. Word had come that the Americans were advancing on Tirad Pass in an effort to cut off Aguinaldo from the Tinio Brigade situated on the Abra River.

The U.S. Army 33rd Infantry Regiment, under Major Peyton C. March took Concepción on December 1 and began to scale Tirad Pass the next day. Although they had difficulty in attacking the Filipino position, they saw an opening with the aid of a Tingguian Igorot named Januario Galut. The Americans then devised a plan to flank the entrenched defenders from the village of Lingay at the foot of the pass, and from the peak. The combined attack surprised the defenders and the engagement barely lasted six hours. Del Pilar was killed in the skirmish from a shot in the neck, killing him instantly. Of the 60 defenders, only eight remained. After the battle, Del Pilar's belongings were taken by the Americans as war trophies, including a handkerchief embroidered with the name Dolores, a locket with a picture of a girl, and his diary. His last entry was:

Reports of Del Pilar's death varied. Two newsmen, John McCutcheon and Richard Henry Little, and a local newspaper called The Manila Freedom reported accounts which captured the imaginations of American and Filipino readers. McCutcheon and Little both reported how del Pilar was the last to fall; how he continually urged his men during the battle to fight on, appealing to their sense of love for their native land; how he refused to turn away on his white horse until all the men had retreated; and his death when a sharpshooter got the better of him. The Manila Freedom wrote this of Del Pilar:

Filipino accounts of Del Pilar's death corroborate each other and are less glamorous. Del Pilar's aide-de-camp, Vicente Enríquez, writes:

Lieutenant Telesforo Carrasco also recounted:

Del Pilar's body lay unburied for days, exposed to the elements. While retracing the trail, an American officer, Lt. Dennis P. Quinlan, gave the body a traditional U.S. military burial. Upon Del Pilar's tombstone, Quinlan inscribed, "An Officer and a Gentleman".

In 1930, Del Pilar's body was exhumed and was identified by dental records.

Personal life
Del Pilar was known for his various relationships during the war. He was reported to have courted almost half a dozen girls, including Neneng Rodrigo, the daughter of Bulacan's civil governor, who has his first love; a sister of Col. José Leyba; a woman named Poleng, and Felicidad Aguinaldo, the sister of Emilio Aguinaldo. It has been asserted that a woman named Remedios Nable José, a daughter of Don Mariano Nable José from Dagupan, was del Pilar's last love. It was said that Nable José and del Pilar were almost married, but Nable José rejected del Pilar's advances, partly due to his reputation as a playboy. Though Nable José’s claim is based solely on an interview of her, there still remained a glaring lack of third-party sources to verify her story. Some are still speculating that her sister, Dolores, was the general's actual last love as there were numbers of third-party resources name her as the one. First, John McCutcheon, the war correspondent that was with the American troops at Tirad Pass. In an article published by the Boston Evening Transcript, McCutcheon details that Gregorio del Pilar and Dolores Nable José were set to be married around mid-November 1899. However, Aguinaldo's order of a hasty retreat in early November caused the wedding to be postponed, and ultimately, to be canceled altogether. He also mentions the handkerchief found on del Pilar's body to be embroidered with Dolores’ name, and that a number of the letters retrieved from his person were from her.

There is good reason to believe in the authenticity of McCutcheon's account. For one, McCutcheon knew del Pilar previously, having interviewed him multiple times throughout the war. For another, he was with the soldiers that looted del Pilar's body, and would have actually seen the spoils himself. He also released more articles that consistently named Dolores, where she could be mentioned. Had he been mistaken, he would have corrected himself in a later article, but the reports did not change. Second, Isaac Cruz Jr.’s biography of Gregorio del Pilar, General Gregorio H. Del Pilar: Idol of the Revolution, includes statements from Tirad Pass survivors that he was able to interview before they passed on.

Lt. José Enríquez recounted that Maj. March showed them some of the del Pilar's belongings in his possession, and asked explicitly for Dolores Nable José. Additionally, Captain Isidro Wenceslao mentioned that Dolores was in del Pilar's thoughts during his last meeting with Aguinaldo.

Aside from being two of the only survivors from the Tirad Pass, both men were particularly close to del Pilar. Enríquez was the younger brother of Vicente Enríquez and Anacleto Enríquez, who were del Pilar's aide-de-camp and supporter respectively. The children of both families were neighbors and childhood friends.

Meanwhile, Isidro Wenceslao was part of the famed "Seven Musketeers of Pitpitan", a group of young men led by del Pilar that initially joined Maestrong Sebio's forces at Kakarong de Sili.

If anyone had been privy to the thoughts and feelings of del Pilar, especially in matters so important to him as love, it would be these men. Third, “Nandaragupan : the story of a coastal city and Dagupan Bangus” names Dolores Nable José as the Dagupan belle that del Pilar fell in love with during his stay in Pangasinan. After del Pilar's death, Dolores seems to have disappeared from the records, as there is no mention of her in the 1916 court case where her other siblings and father appear.

Despite all this, del Pilar's love life still remains a mystery to all historians.

Memorials

Fort Del Pilar, home of the Philippine Military Academy in Baguio, is named after him.
 In 1944, the Japanese-sponsored Philippine republic of President Jose P. Laurel issued the Tirad Pass Medal commemorating the battle and del Pilar's sacrifice. A bust of General del Pilar occupies the center of the obverse (front) side of the medal. The Tirad Pass Medal was the only award issued to recognize service to the Laurel government during the Japanese occupation.
 In 1955, the town of Concepcion, Ilocos Sur, where the Battle of Tirad Pass took place, was renamed Gregorio del Pilar in his honor.
 In 2011, the newest vessel of the Philippine Navy, BRP Gregorio del Pilar, was named after him. The ship is a patrol frigate.

In popular culture
 Portrayed by José Padilla Jr. in the postwar film Hen. Gregorio del Pilar (1949), opposite Tessie Quintana.
 His life was shown in the Philippine television news show Case Unclosed as its 13th episode.
 Portrayed by Romnick Sarmenta in the film Tirad Pass: The Last Stand of Gen. Gregorio del Pilar (1996).
 Portrayed by Dingdong Dantes in the official Lupang Hinirang  music video produced by GMA Network released in 2010.
 Portrayed by Felix Roco in the film El Presidente (2012).
 Portrayed by Paulo Avelino in the films Heneral Luna (2015) and its sequel, Goyo: Ang Batang Heneral (2018).
The final chapter of novel Po-on written by National Artist for Literature F. Sionil Jose describes del Pilar's final evening and the Battle of Tirad Pass from the point of view of Eustaquio Samson, a fictional character. Samson is an Ilocano farmer forced to flee his hometown after suffering abuse from a Spanish friar. Having been the confidante of Apolinario Mabini in Rosales town and now acting as his messenger, Samson is cold-shouldered by del Pilar when Samson tells him he lost Mabini's letter; and further suspected of being an enemy spy when Samson claims he was beaten unconscious by the Americans at Candon but somehow woke up alive and abandoned amongst the dead villagers. Samson describes del Pilar as vain, arrogant, and full of youthful folly. He nevertheless joins the Tagalog defenders of the Pass in honor of the "Honorable Cripple" and out of patriotic duty.

See also
 Gregorio del Pilar class frigate, Philippine Navy
 BRP Gregorio del Pilar, Philippine Navy frigate

References

Notes

Citations

Further reading
 
 Amparo Nable Jose v. Mariano Nable Jose <http://www.lawphil.net/judjuris/juri1916/dec1916/gr_l-7397_1916.html>
 History of Dagupan 
 “An observer in the Philippines; or, Life in our new possessions” by John Devins (1905) Original Boston Evening Transcript
 Government Electoral Almanac
 “Feeding Manila in Peace and War, 1850-1945” by Daniel F. Doeppers (2016)
 “General Gregorio H. Del Pilar: Idol of the Revolution” by Isaac Cruz Jr. (1985)
 “Nandaragupan : the story of a coastal city and Dagupan Bangus” by Jesus Victor Vistro and Crispina Reyes (2005)

External links
 General Gregorio Del Pilar - Philippine Military Academy
 
 
 

1875 births
1899 deaths
Ateneo de Manila University alumni
Deaths by firearm in the Philippines
Filipino generals
Paramilitary Filipinos
People from Bulacan
Military personnel killed in the Philippine–American War
People of the Philippine Revolution